NewsBlur is an American software company based in New York City and San Francisco. It runs an online RSS news reader service accessible both online and via a free open-source mobile app for offline reading. Furthermore, the software powering NewsBlur is available and is published in an open-source application, licensed under the MIT License. Limited access to the service is free for up to 64 sites; unlimited access is available for an annual subscription fee.

The company was founded in 2009 by Samuel Clay. In March 2013, following an announcement by Google that they would be shutting down their popular Google Reader news reader service, NewsBlur's subscriber base immediately rose from about 1,500 users to over 60,000.

See also
Comparison of feed aggregators

References

External links

Software companies based in New York (state)
Software companies based in the San Francisco Bay Area
Software companies established in 2009
News aggregators
Free and open-source Android software
IOS software
Free software
Software using the MIT license
Y Combinator companies
Software companies of the United States

2009 establishments in the United States
2009 establishments in New York (state)
American companies established in 2009